Syed Bilawal Shah Noorani was a Sufi saint whose shrine is located  in Balochistan, a western province of Pakistan.

His shrine is located at a valley of Lahoot La Makan, Khuzdar.

Life 
Historian Mir Ali Sher Qaune Thattvi writes that Noorani traveled from Thatta to an area of present Balochistan in or about 1449 AD. This was during the realm of Jam Nizamuddin II Samo, a ruler of Samma dynasty of Sindh. Noorani lived at present Lahoot La Makan vale. The believers relate Noorani to the fourth Caliph Ali. It is believed that Caliph Ali fought with Gokal demon or Dev. After defeating devil, the caliph locked up the demon in a cave and closed the opening or entry of cave with mount.

The dhamaal (a kind of mystic rite) is performed at his shrine during an annual fair held as part of Ramdan. Pilgrims from Sindh, mostly visit the shrine by foot at the time of annual fair. They proceed from Sehwan Sharif after the end of the fair of Lal Shahbaz Qalandar via Naig Valley. They walk along stony routes through the Kirthar Mountains.

Terrorist attack 
A suicide bomb was ignited at the shrine in 2016 and many people were killed or wounded.

References

Sufism in Pakistan
Sufi saints
Shrines in Pakistan